Embarrass River may refer to:

Embarrass River (Minnesota)
Embarrass River (Wisconsin)

See also
Embarras River (disambiguation)